The prime minister of East Timor, officially the Prime Minister of the Democratic Republic of Timor Leste, is the head of government in East Timor.

The president of East Timor is the head of state. The president appoints the prime minister, after parliamentary elections and have listened to all parties represented in the National Parliament, who is usually the leader of the majority party or majority coalition. The prime minister is ex officio a member of the Council of State, chairs the cabinet and oversees the activities of the government.

List of prime ministers of East Timor
Political parties

Other factions

Prime Minister of East Timor during War for Independence

Chief ministers during United Nations administration

Prime ministers of the Democratic Republic of Timor-Leste

List of deputy prime ministers of East Timor

See also
 East Timor
 Politics of East Timor
 List of colonial governors of Portuguese Timor
 President of East Timor
 Lists of office-holders

Notes

References

External links
 Office of the Prime Minister

 
1975 establishments in East Timor
2002 establishments in East Timor